Miriamne Ara Krummel is an American professor of English at the University of Dayton. She is a graduate of the University of Connecticut and has a master's degree from Hunter College and Ph.D. from Lehigh University.

Her books include Crafting Jewishness in Medieval England: Legally Absent, Virtually Present (Palgrave Macmillan, 2011), Jews in Medieval England: Teaching Representations of the Other (edited with Tison Pugh, Palgrave Macmillan, 2017), which won the 2019 Idaho State University Teaching Literature Book Award, and The Medieval Postcolonial Jew, in and Out of Time (University of Michigan Press, 2022).

References

American medievalists
American women historians
Historians of Jews and Judaism
University of Connecticut alumni
Hunter College alumni
Lehigh University alumni
University of Dayton faculty
Living people
Year of birth missing (living people)